Alberta Provincial Highway No. 9, commonly referred to as Highway 9, is a highway in south-central Alberta, Canada, which together with Saskatchewan Highway 7 connects Calgary to Saskatoon, Saskatchewan via Drumheller. It is designated as a core route of the National Highway System, forming a portion of an interprovincial corridor.

Route description 

For its first , Highway 9 generally runs in a north/south direction to Beiseker, where it meets Highways 72 and 806. Highway 9 leaves the concurrence at this point and runs east/west for the balance of route to the Saskatchewan border, providing connections to Hanna and Oyen as well as numerous smaller communities, and generally running parallel to Highway 12 to the north. The highway continues as Saskatchewan Highway 7 in a northeast direction toward Saskatoon.

History 

Over the past few years, the province of Alberta has executed a number of upgrades to the highway, widening shoulders and realigning the road (most recently just west of Drumheller, although the new alignment now bypasses the Horseshoe Canyon landmark as a result). As of 2007, however, the province has yet to twin any stretch of the busy highway, and there have been calls for interchanges to be built at its junctions with Highway 21 and the Trans-Canada due to the number of fatal automobile accidents that have happened at these locations.

A partial cloverleaf interchange was constructed in 2007 where Highway 9 crosses the Trans-Canada Highway. As well, the junction with Highway 21 was changed to a four-way stop in early 2011.

Major intersections 
The following is a list of major intersections along Alberta Highway 9 from west to east.

Highway 797 

Alberta Provincial Highway No. 797, commonly referred to as Highway 797, is a highway in the Calgary Region that functions as a southern extension of Highway 9. It presently is in two segments; the  northern segment runs from Highway 560 (Glenmore Trail) in Langdon to the Trans-Canada Highway, while the  southern section is unsigned and runs from Highway 552 to the south bank of the Bow River. The northern segment used to extend from Langdon to the north bank of the Bow River, indicating that a bridge might be constructed to connect the two sections. The bridge was not constructed and the  section was transferred to Rocky View County in the 2000s.

References 

009
797
Drumheller